Computer-mediated reality refers to the ability to add to, subtract information from, or otherwise manipulate one's perception of reality through the use of a wearable computer or hand-held device such as a smartphone.

Mediated reality is a proper superset of mixed reality, augmented reality, and virtual reality, as it also includes, for example, diminished reality.

Typically, it is the user's visual perception of the environment that is mediated. This is done through the use of some kind of electronic device, such as an EyeTap device or smart phone, which can act as a visual filter between the real world and what the user perceives. Computer-mediated reality has been used to enhance visual perception as an aid to the visually impaired. This example achieves a mediated reality by altering a video input stream light that would have normally reached the user's eyes, and computationally altering it to filter it into a more useful form. It has also been used for interactive computer interfaces.

The use of computer-mediated reality to diminish perception, by the removal or masking of visual data, has been used for architectural applications, and is an area of ongoing research.

The long-term effects of altering perceived reality have not been thoroughly studied, and negative side effects of long-term exposure might be possible. Short term effects have been demonstrated with the eyestrain caused by computers.

As a seeing aid
In the 1970s and 1980s, Steve Mann introduced the Generation-1 and Generation-2 "Digital Eye Glass", initially as a vision aid to help people see better, as a welding helmet, and as a general-purpose seeing aid for everyday life as outlined in IEEE Technology & Society 31(3) and the supplemental material entitled "GlassEyes".

In this sense, mediated reality is a proper superset of mixed reality, augmented reality, and virtual reality, as it also includes, for example, diminished reality.

Window managers
One common window manager in mediated reality is the "Reality Window Manager".

Wireless mediated reality
With wireless communications, mediated reality can also become a communications medium among different communities. For example, Bluetooth devices are often used with mediated reality. With the use of EyeTap, such interaction is called "seeing eye-to-eye".

Applications

Applications of mediated reality include devices that help people see better, as well as devices for gaming and equipment repair, telemedicine, remote expert advice interfaces, and wayfinding. Mediated reality is also used in robotics and drawing applications such as the "Loose and Sketchy" drawing package.

One key application of computer-mediated reality is healthcare and medicine, which has become a popular research area, specifically beginning in the 1990s with the field growing larger over time. Common research topics include applications of computer-mediated reality in surgery, diagnosing diseases generally, and aiding care of neurodegenerative diseases like Parkinson's. In surgery, studies have shown that the use of virtual reality simulations can be used to reduce error, improve efficiency, and be used generally as training. Other applications in surgery include modeling, which allows for more extensive planning of surgeries prior to the procedure that can also be more personalized to the patient, and image-guided surgery, in which machines and overlays would allow for more accuracy in the surgical processes. There have even been complete telesurgeries, where the surgeon operates on a 3D model of the patient while a robot executes the actions. This has been used for basic surgeries on swine and more advanced surgeries on swine and humans. With neurodegenerative diseases, virtual reality has been used to simulate situations that train memory but aren't reproduce in a standard treatment environment. Virtual reality may also be used for interfacing with a patient in their home, with data sent directly to the physician, or creating games that would encourage these exercises. Virtual reality has also been used to aid those with a fear of heights, anxiety, depression, and autism. It has also been used to reduce patients' pain.

A widely implemented development of computer-mediated reality in medicine is the invention of electronic consultation, such as services like Teladoc.

Within video games, the most common form of computer-mediated reality is virtual reality headsets, such as Oculus Rift. These are devices that attach to the user's head and immerse their field of vision solely within the game world. Controllers used for virtual reality games range from traditionally designed controllers to controllers designed to track the motions of the user. However, alongside the uses previously mention in medical fields, virtual reality has gained notoriety with Meta, formerly known as Facebook, and the introduction of their "metaverse." The metaverse is intended to be designed in a similar fashion to massive multiplayer online games, where users can interact with each other in an interconnected virtual space. It has already been subject to controversy, as a woman claimed she was assaulted in the Metaverse. In addition to virtual reality, augmented reality has also been used for video games. The most prominent example is Pokémon Go, an augmented reality game for mobile devices where Pokémon creatures are displayed through the phone to appear as if they are part of the real world. Other examples of AR games include Harry Potter: Wizards Unite and Ingress, which was developed by the same developer behind Pokémon Go.

Augmented reality technology has similarly been applied with social media applications such as Snapchat. These lenses range from adding 3D digital objects to pictures to altering the appearance of those in the photos. One of the most common types are beauty filters, which digitally alter the user's appearance to make the user appear more "beautiful." Beauty filters have been correlated to lower self esteem.

Related concepts

Mediated reality is related to other concepts such as augmented reality (which is a special case of mediated reality), virtual reality, mixed reality, etc.

See also

References

External links
 EyeTap.org Mediated Reality Research
 Mediated Reality based on the VideoOrbits head tracker
 Diminished Reality example to show something where Mediated Reality is definitely a proper superset of Augmented Reality

Multimodal interaction
User interface techniques
Cyberpunk themes